Feldkirchen an der Donau is a municipality in the district of Urfahr-Umgebung in the Austrian state of Upper Austria. A group of five lakes called the Feldkirchner Badeseen (Feldkirchen Bathing Lakes) is located in the municipality.

Feldkirchen was the birthplace of the conductor and composer Hans Schläger (1820–1885).

Population

References

Cities and towns in Urfahr-Umgebung District